Yeldy Marie Louison (born 11 November 1991) is a Mauritian female badminton player.

Achievements

All-Africa Games 
Women's doubles

African Championships
Women's doubles

Mixed doubles

BWF International Challenge/Series
Women's doubles

Mixed doubles

 BWF International Challenge tournament
 BWF International Series tournament
 BWF Future Series tournament

References

External links 
 
 
 

1991 births
Living people
People from Plaines Wilhems District
Mauritian female badminton players
Badminton players at the 2010 Commonwealth Games
Badminton players at the 2014 Commonwealth Games
Commonwealth Games competitors for Mauritius
Competitors at the 2015 African Games
African Games gold medalists for Mauritius
African Games silver medalists for Mauritius
African Games medalists in badminton